Millvale may refer to:
Millvale, Cincinnati, Ohio
Millvale, Pennsylvania
Millvale, Prince Edward Island
Millvale, Bessbrook, Northern Ireland